General elections were held in Ecuador on 20 October 2002, with a second round of the presidential elections on 24 November. The result was a victory for Lucio Gutiérrez of the PSP–MUPP–NP alliance, who won the run-off with 54.8% of the vote. The Social Christian Party emerged as the largest party in the National Congress, winning 24 of the 100 seats.

Results

President

National Congress

References

Elections in Ecuador
Ecuador
General election
Election and referendum articles with incomplete results
Ecuador
Ecuador